Auxillia Mnangagwa (née Kutyauripo; born 25 March 1963) is a Zimbabwean politician and has served as the First Lady of Zimbabwe since November 2017, as the wife of President Emmerson Mnangagwa. After spending over ten years at the Ministry of Manpower and Development, she joined the Prime Minister's office in 1992. She was elected as a ZANU–PF Member of Parliament in 2015, serving for the same constituency as her husband after he became Vice-President under Robert Mugabe.

Biography
Born on 25 March 1963 in Mazowe District in Mashonaland Central, Auxillia was the second child in a family of five. She was brought up on a farm in Chiweshe where she attended primary and secondary school. Her parents divorced when she was in Grade 3. After completing a secretarial course at Silveira House, Chishawasha, in 1981, she worked for the Ministry of Manpower and Development under Edgar Tekere. She entered politics in 1982, eventually rising to the politburo. From 1992, she was assigned to the Prime Minister's office, joining the Central Intelligence Organisation in 1997. Some reports maintain that from 1992, acting as a high-level security officer at the Sheraton Hotel, she provided information to Mugabe on Emmerson Mnangagwa who was then the de facto head of the CIO. She denies these assertions.

In 1997, she began studying in the Environment and Tourism department at the University of Zimbabwe. She left for Switzerland two years later, graduating in Hotel and Tourism Administration in 2001. On her return to Zimbabwe, she joined the finance department of ZANU-PF in Kwekwe. Following an unsuccessful attempt to stand for the ZANU-PF in her native Mazowe Central, she joined the party's Central Committee in 2009. On behalf of Zanu-PF, she set up a number of women's banks in at Silobela, Zhombe, Kwekwe and Chirumanzu-Zibagwe in Zimbabwe's Midlands Province.

Following her husband's appointment as Vice-President, she stood as the Member of Parliament for Chirumanzu–Zibagwe. After the withdrawal of the two other candidates, she went on to win the parliamentary by-election in 2015.

Personal life
It is believed she married Emmerson Mnangagwa following the death of his previous wife Jayne, the sister of Josiah Tongogara, at which point she became his third wife. They have three children together: Emmerson Jr., Sean, and Collins.

Electoral history

See also
 First Lady of Zimbabwe
Chirumanzu–Zibagwe

References

External links
Telegraph photograph of Auxillia and Emmerson Mnangagwa arriving at the presidential inauguration on 24 November 2017

1963 births
Living people
First Ladies of Zimbabwe
Emmerson Mnangagwa
ZANU–PF politicians
21st-century Zimbabwean politicians
Members of the National Assembly of Zimbabwe
University of Zimbabwe alumni
People from Mashonaland Central Province
20th-century Zimbabwean politicians